Terminal Ceilândia is a Federal District Metro brazilian station on Green line. The station is the western terminus of Green line. It was opened on 16 April 2008 as part of the section between Ceilândia Sul and Terminal Ceilândia. The adjacent station is Ceilândia Norte.

References

Brasília Metro stations
2008 establishments in Brazil
Railway stations opened in 2008